ICL may refer to:

Companies and organizations
 Idaho Conservation League
 Imperial College London, a UK university
 Indian Confederation of Labour
 Indian Cricket League
 Inorganic Chemistry Laboratory of the University of Oxford
 Israel Chemicals, an Israeli multi-national chemical company that produces and markets fertilizers, metals and other special-purpose chemical products
 International Computers Limited, a UK company acquired by Fujitsu
 International Confederation of Labor, a global anarcho-syndicalist union federation
 International Consortium on Landslides, Kyoto, Japan

Computing
 Ice Lake series Intel CPUs
 Icon library filename extension
 Clean (programming language) source filename extension
 Inter-Chassis Link, Brocade's name for an InterSwitch Trunk link

Chemistry and biology
 Idiopathic CD4+ lymphocytopenia, a medical condition
 Implantable collamer lens
 Isocitrate lyase, an enzyme
 ICl, chemical symbol for iodine monochloride
 Intracaval leiomyomatosis

Other
 Image cash letter, a virtual cheque
 International Conference on Interactive Computer Aided Learning
 International Congress of Linguists
 International constitutional law
 International criminal law
 Initial Climb, in aviation
 Inrush current limiter, in electronics
 ICAO designator for CAL Cargo Air Lines of Israel
 ISO 639-3 code for Icelandic Sign Language
 I Can't Lie - British text slang

See also
 International Communist League (disambiguation), Trotskyist political parties